Agastisvarar Temple is a Siva temple in Koranattukarupur near Kumbakonam in Thanjavur district in Tamil Nadu, India.

Vaippu Sthalam
It is one of the shrines of the Vaippu Sthalams sung by Tamil Saivite Nayanar Sundarar.

Presiding deity
The presiding deity is known as Agastisvarar. The Goddess is known as Akilandesvari. At the left of the shrine of the presiding deity, shrine of Goddess is found. In the kosta, Lingodbhava, Brahma and Durga are found. There is also Bhairava in the temple.

Nearby temple
Very near to this temple, a temple known as Sundaresvarar Temple is found.

References

Gallery 

Hindu temples in Thanjavur district
Shiva temples in Thanjavur district